Fenghuangshan Subdistrict is a subdistrict in Baota District, Yan'an, Shaanxi, China. As of 2010, the subdistrict has a population of 44,294.

History 
The area of contemporary Fenghuangshan Subdistrict is home to a series of centuries old yaodong complexes, most notably, Zhenxilou, which was built into the subdistrict's eponymous Fenghuang Mountain by Fan Zhongyan during the Northern Song dynasty.

From January 13, 1937 to November 1938, during the Chinese Civil War, the Central Committee of the Chinese Communist Party was based out of the foothills of Fenghuang Mountain.

The division was established as the Fenghuangshan People's Commune in March 1972. Fenghuangshan was changed to a subdistrict in September 1984, as people's communes were being phased out.

Geography 
Fenghuangshan Subdistrict is located in the northwestern portion of Baota District, where the eponymous Fenghuang Mountain lies.

Administrative divisions 
Fenghuangshan administers seven residential communities and two administrative villages.

Residential communities 
The subdistrict administers the following seven residential communities:

 Beiyuan Community
 Wenhuagou Community
 Beiguan Street Community
 Beimenkou Community
 Fenghuangshan Community
 Zhongxin Street Community
 Xigou Community

Villages 
The subdistrict administers the following two administrative villages:

 Wenyi Village
 Wen'er Village

Demographics 
As of the 2010 Chinese Census, Fenghuangshan has a population of 44,294, an increase from the 41,194 recorded in the 2000 Chinese Census. A 1996 estimate put the subdistrict's population at 29,000. In the 1982 Chinese Census, the Fenghuangshan People's Commune had a population of 19,667, comprising 4,312 households.

See also
List of township-level divisions of Shaanxi

References

Baota District
Township-level divisions of Shaanxi
Subdistricts of the People's Republic of China